Mazdabad-e Bala (also Romanized as Mazdābād-e Bālā; also known as Mazdābād and Mazdābād) is a village in Kachu Rural District, in the Central District of Ardestan County, Isfahan Province, Iran. At the 2006 census, its population was 62, in 18 families.

References 

Populated places in Ardestan County